Marq Mellor (born March 5, 1968 in Long Island, New York) is a former field hockey forward from the United States, who finished twelfth with the national team at the 1996 Summer Olympics in Atlanta, Georgia.

References
 USA Field Hockey

External links
 

1968 births
Living people
American male field hockey players
Olympic field hockey players of the United States
Field hockey players at the 1996 Summer Olympics
People from Long Island
Pan American Games bronze medalists for the United States
Pan American Games medalists in field hockey
Field hockey players at the 1995 Pan American Games
Medalists at the 1995 Pan American Games